Bernadette Després (born March 28, 1941) is a French illustrator and comic book artist.

She was born in Paris and studied at the Ecole de l'Union Centrale des Arts Décoratifs there. In 1977, she introduced Tom-Tom and Nana, probably the most popular French comics series for young people, in the magazine J'aime lire; the series has also been adapted for television.

In 1990, she was awarded the Prix RTL. In 2001, Tom-Tom and Nana received the Prix spécial du public jeunesse at the Le Festival de la bande dessinée de Darnétal.

References

External links 
 

1941 births
Living people
French comics artists
French female comics artists
French illustrators
French women illustrators
Artists from Paris